Ernst-Hubertus Deloch (17 May 1886 – ?) was a German equestrian who competed in the 1912 Summer Olympics.

He won the bronze medal in the equestrian team jumping event.

References

External links 
 profile

1886 births
Year of death missing
German male equestrians
German show jumping riders
Equestrians at the 1912 Summer Olympics
Olympic equestrians of Germany
Olympic bronze medalists for Germany
Olympic medalists in equestrian
Medalists at the 1912 Summer Olympics